Sergey Olegovich Malov (born 18 June 1983 in Leningrad, Soviet Union) is a Russian/Hungarian  violinist and violist.

Life 
Malov was born in Leningrad (now Saint-Petersburg) in 1983. His father Oleg Malov is a pianist and professor at the Saint Petersburg Conservatory. His mother Klara Lyudvigovna Malova is a music teacher.

Malov's first teacher was Tatiana Liberova (Saint Petersburg). 

Malov is a winner of international violinist and violist competitions. He plays violoncello da spalla. He speaks six languages: Russian, German, English, French, Spanish and Hungarian. He enjoys sports, plays soccer, practices martial arts.

Concerts 
Malov has performed with such orchestras as:
 Bavarian Radio Symphony Orchestra
 London Philharmonic Orchestra
 Camerata Salzburg
 Saint Petersburg Academic Symphony Orchestra
 Moscow Philharmonic Orchestra
 and others.

Honours and awards
Malov was first prize winner of the following competitions:
 Michael Hill International Violin Competition in New Zealand (2011),
 International Mozart Competition in Salzburg (2011),
 Jasha Heifetz Competition in Vilnius (2009), 
 International Tokyo Viola Competition (2009),
 and others

References

Sources

External links 

 
 
 
 

Russian classical violinists
Male classical violinists
Russian classical violists
Living people
1983 births
21st-century classical violinists
21st-century Russian male musicians
21st-century violists